Spilarctia irregularis is a moth in the family Erebidae. It was described by Walter Rothschild in 1910. It is found in the Chinese provinces of Hubei, Sichuan, Yunnan, Henan, Hunan and Shaanxi.

References

Moths described in 1910
irregularis